David Hill (born 1965) is an English former professional footballer who played as a forward.

Career
Born in Bradford, Hill signed for Bradford City in January 1982 after participating in their Youth Opportunity Scheme, leaving the club in December 1983 to trial with Barnsley. During his time with Bradford City he made five appearances in the Football League, scoring one goal; he also made one appearance in the FA Cup.

Sources

References

1965 births
Living people
English footballers
Bradford City A.F.C. players
English Football League players
Association football forwards